A Mad & Faithful Telling is the fifth album from the band DeVotchKa. It was released by ANTI- Records on March 18, 2008. The band's largest tour to date, in support of A Mad & Faithful Telling, began on April 26, 2008 at the Coachella Music Festival.

Track listing
All lyrics and music by Nick Urata and DeVotchKa.
 "Basso Profundo"
 "Along the Way"
 "The Clockwise Witness"
 "Head Honcho"
 "Comrade Z"
 "Transliterator"
 "Blessing in Disguise"
 "Undone"
 "Strizzalo"
 "New World"
 "Undone" (With the Hagerman Quartet) [Digital Release Only Bonus Track]

Personnel
 DeVotchKa:
 Vocals, guitar: Nick Urata
 Sousaphone: Jeanie Schroder
 Drums: Shawn King
 Piano: Thomas Hagerman
Strings:
Violin 1: Tom Hagerman
Violin 2: Takanori Sugishita
Viola: Leah Nelson
Cello: Charles Lee
Hot Guitar: Tom Echols
Oboe: Kyle Mendenhall
Trumpets:
Jacob Valenzuela
Ron Miles
 Additional Vocals
Timur Bekbosunov
Alexandra Walker

Reception

External links
Official website
Label website
2008 Tour information

References

2008 albums
DeVotchKa albums
Anti- (record label) albums